Geoffrey Howorth Spencer Wood (1927, Vowchurch, Herefordshire, England – 1957, Kuala Belait, Borneo (now Brunei)) was an English botanist. He obtained an MA in botany and forestry from Oxford University in 1952. In 1954 he became Curator at the Sandakan Herbarium in present-day Sabah. His main area of interest was trees in the family Dipterocarpaceae. He died in 1957 from injuries suffered in a fuel explosion on a botanical expedition in the Andulau Hills of Brunei.

Wood named several plant species, including Hopea wyattsmithii and Shorea symingtonii. The species Shorea woodii and Madhuca woodii are named for him.

Works

References

1927 births
1957 deaths
English botanists
20th-century British botanists
Alumni of the University of Oxford
People from Herefordshire